The Quebec Junior Football League (QJFL) is a junior Canadian football competition held in Quebec, Canada since 1970, as a successor to the Quebec Juvenile Football League. It began competition as a conference of the Canadian Junior Football League from which it eventually withdrew. Upon withdrawal from the CJFL, the QJFL incorporated teams from the Ottawa, Ontario region and created the league as it stands today. In one form or another, the QJFL can trace its roots back to 1908.  Annually the League awards the regular season champions the Cyril T. White Trophy, and the playoff champions the Joe Pistilli Cup, formerly known as the Manson Cup.

Teams (2019 season)

Chateauguay Junior Raiders
North Shore Sabercats
Ottawa Junior Riders
South Shore JR Packers
Quebec City Bataillon

Joe Pistilli Cup Champions (Manson Cup until 2010)

2019 - Ottawa Junior Riders (17-7 over Chateauguay Junior Raiders)
2018 - Ottawa Junior Riders (30-13 over North Shore Sabercats)
2017 - Chateauguay Junior Raiders (33-29 over South Shore Junior Bruizers)
2016 - South Shore Junior Bruizers (17-16 over Montreal Royals)
2015 - Chateauguay Junior Raiders (29-9 over South Shore Junior Bruizers)
2014 - North Shore Sabercats (16-14 over ETS Genie)
2013 - North Shore Sabercats (30-23 over South Shore Junior Bruizers)
2012 - North Shore Sabercats (52-34 over Ottawa Junior Riders)
2011 - North Shore Sabercats (37-24 over Chateauguay Junior Raiders)
2010 - Ottawa Junior Riders (10-0 over Chateauguay Junior Raiders)
2009 - Chateauguay Junior Raiders (20-19 over Ottawa Junior Riders)
2008 - Ottawa Junior Riders (63-16 over Chateauguay Junior Raiders)
2007 - Ottawa Junior Riders (29-27 over Ottawa Sooners)
2006 - Ottawa Junior Riders (19-2 over Chateauguay Junior Raiders)
2005 - Chateauguay Junior Raiders (18-16 over Ottawa Sooners)
2004 - Chateauguay Junior Raiders (36-34 over Ottawa Sooners)
2003 - Chateauguay Junior Raiders (22-13 over Ottawa Sooners)
2002 - Ottawa Sooners
2001 - Ottawa Sooners (18-17 over Ottawa Junior Riders)
2000 - Ottawa Junior Riders
1999 - Ottawa Junior Riders
1998 - Ottawa Junior Riders
1997 - Ottawa Sooners (13-7 over Ottawa Junior Riders)
1996 - South Shore Packers (14-12 over Ottawa Sooners)
1995 - Pierrefonds Broncos
1994 - St-Leonard Cougars
1993 - West Island Broncos
1992 - West Island Broncos
1991 - St-Hubert Rebelles
1990 - St-Hubert Rebelles
1989 - North Shore Broncos
1988 - Chateauguay Junior Raiders

Cyril T. White Trophy 
2019 - Laval Junior Bulldogs 
2018 - South Shore Junior Bruizers 
2017 - South Shore Junior Bruizers 
2016 - South Shore Junior Bruizers 
2015 - Chateauguay Junior Raiders
2014 - North Shore Sabercats
2013 - South Shore Junior Bruizers
2012 - North Shore Sabercats
2011 - Ottawa Junior Riders
2010 - Ottawa Junior Riders
2009 - Ottawa Junior Riders
2008 - Ottawa Sooners
2007 - Ottawa Junior Riders
2006 - Ottawa Junior Riders
2005 - Chateauguay Junior Raiders
2004 - Ottawa Sooners
2003 - Ottawa Sooners
2002 - Ottawa Sooners
2001 - Ottawa Sooners
2000 - Ottawa Junior Riders
1999 - Ottawa Junior Riders
1998 - Chateauguay Raiders
1997 - Ottawa Sooners
1996 - South Shore Packers
1995 - South Shore Packers
1994 - St-Leonard Cougars
1993 - West Island Broncos
1992 - West Island Broncos
1991 - St-Hubert Rebelles
1990 - St-Hubert Rebelles
1989 - St-Leonard Cougars

Trophies 

Cyril T. White Trophy - Winners of the Regular Season

Joe Pistilli Cup - Winners of the Playoffs

Bob Geary Trophy - Player of the Year

Sport O'Keefe Trophy - Most Valuable Player to his Team

Kelvin Kirk Trophy - Offensive Player of the Year

Schenley Trophy - Defensive Player of the Year

Trevor Bennett Trophy - Offensive Lineman of the Year

Alex Chapman Trophy - Rookie of the Year

Past Junior teams in Quebec Leagues 

Chateauguay Ramblers
Cornwall Emards
Cumberland Panthers
ETS Genie
Joliette Pirates
Laval Devils
Laval Scorpions
Montreal Royals
Montreal Junior Alouettes
Montreal Junior Concordes
North Shore Broncos
Notre-Dame-de-Grace Maple Leafs
Ottawa Sooners
Québec Citadelles
Rosemont Bombers
Sherbrooke Blitz
St-Hubert Rebelles
St-Lazare Stallions
St-Leonard Cougars
South Shore Cobras
South Shore Monarx
South Shore Packers
Valleyfield Phalanges
Verdun Invictus
Verdun Maple Leafs
Verdun Shamcats
Ville Emard Juveniles
 Sun Youth SunDevils

See also
Canadian football
Football Canada
Canadian Football League
Canadian Junior Football League
U Sports football
Canadian Interuniversity Sport
Canadian Colleges Athletic Association
Comparison of Canadian and American football

External links
 QJFL Website (English)
 QJFL Website (French)

Sources
 http://www.qjfl.ca/

 
3